César González may refer to:

Sportspeople
César González (Peruvian footballer) (fl. 1970s)
César González (fencer) (born 1965), Spanish fencer
César Cuauhtémoc González or Silver King (1968–2019), Mexican masked wrestler and actor
César González Navas (born 1980), Spanish footballer for FC Rubin Kazan
César Eduardo González (born 1982), Venezuelan footballer for Deportivo Táchira
César González (bobsleigh) (born 1982), Dutch bobsledder born in the Dominican Republic
César González (Chilean footballer) (born 1997)

Others
César Rodríguez González (1894–1962), Spanish journalist and politician
César González Martínez (1904–1984), Venezuelan lawyer and interior minister
César Luis González (1919–1943), officer in the United States Army Air Forces
César González (poet) (born 1989), Argentinean poet